Egyptian parliamentary elections to the House of Representatives were held in two phases, from 17 October to 2 December 2015. The elected parliament will be entrusted with the task of reviewing the laws that were passed while a parliament was not in session.

In preparation for the election, security was tightened across the country with at least 185,000 troops supporting police, president Sisi made a televised appeal for Egyptians to vote, and in mid-October, public sector employees were given half a day's holiday to encourage them to take part. The strikingly low turnout, in some areas close to only 10%, with "many angry at the government and its policies", was widely regarded as a set-back for the administration and a success for calls to boycotts from oppositional movements.

Electoral system
The parliament is made up of 596 seats, with 448 seats elected through the single member districts, 120 elected through party bloc vote in which party list should win 50%+ votes to win all seats however if no list achieved the threshold, a second round held between top two parties and the list with the most votes wins. Party list contain quotas for youth, women, Christians, and workers. Single member districts consists of 1-member district, 2-member districts, 3-member district and 4-member districts, winner should win 50%+ of the votes, if no one achieved the threshold a second round held between top candidates (candidates number should be the double of contested seat number) and the candidate with the most votes wins. In addition, 28 are selected by the president. The  government commission that set the rules for the 2015 parliamentary elections  drastically reduced the number of "list seats" (candidates who shared party affiliations or other alliances, and whose ranks had to include people under the age of thirty-five, women, Christians, and other traditionally underrepresented groups) from the 2011 election."

Procedure

First phase: Upper Egypt & West Delta
In the first phase, elections were held from 17 to 28 October 2015 in the fourteen governorates of the Upper Egypt and West Delta regions, namely the governorates of Giza, Fayoum, Beni Suef, Minya, Asyut, New Valley, Sohag, Qena, Luxor, Aswan, Red Sea, Alexandria, Beheira, and Matruh.

For these governorates, the first round of elections took place on 18 to 19 October for Egyptian residents, while it took place on 17 to 18 October for Egyptian expatriates. Runoffs were held on 27 to 28 October for Egyptians residents, and on 26 to 27 October for Egyptian expatriates.

Nominations started on 1 September, and lasted until 12 September (with the exception of the Qena and Qoss districts, which were extended until 15 September), though candidates had until 15 September to submit the necessary medical tests. Campaigning for the first phase started on 29 September and ended on 15 October.

Second phase: Central and East Delta
In the second phase, elections took place from 21 November to 2 December 2015 in the remaining nine governorates of the Central Delta and East Delta regions, namely the governorates of Cairo, Qalyubia, Dakahlia, Monufia, Gharbia, Kafr el-Sheikh, Sharqia, Damietta, Port Said, Ismailia, Suez, North Sinai, and South Sinai.

For these governorates, the first round of elections took place on 22 to 23 November for Egyptian residents and 21 to 22 November for Egyptian expatriates. Runoffs were held on 1 to 2 December for Egyptian residents, and on 30 November to 1 December for Egyptian expatriates.

Campaigning  started on 2 November and ended on 20 November 2015.

Candidates 
On 16 September, the High Elections Committee announced the initial list of accepted candidates. While nine electoral lists were accepted, five more lists were rejected, including two of the three lists of the Egypt coalition (Egyptian Front & Independent Current Coalition) as well as the lists of Upper Egypt's Voice, Call of Egypt and Knights of Egypt. After appealing to court, all rejected lists but the one by Upper Egypt's Voice were admitted. The final list of candidates for the first phase was announced on 28 September.

A total of 7 electoral lists are contesting the 120 fixed-list seats available in the four regional constituencies:

In the first phase, 2,573 individual candidates contested in 226 individual seats. Many parties are fielding individual candidates both on joint electoral lists and contesting the list-based seats.

Results

First phase

|- style="background:#e9e9e9;"
!class="unsortable"|
! style="text-align:center;"| Party
! style="text-align:center;"| Ideology
! style="text-align:center;"| Candidates
! style="text-align:center;"| Run-offcandidates
! style="text-align:center;"| % Reaching runoff
! style="text-align:center;"| Votes
! style="text-align:center;"| Seats
|- style="text-align:right;"
|bgcolor="" width=1|
| align=left |Free Egyptians Party
|align="left"|Liberalism
| 111
| 64
| 56.63
| 1,009,083
| 41
|- style="text-align:right;"
|bgcolor="#8B0000" width=1|
| style="text-align:left;"|Nation's Future Party
|align="left" |Populism
| 89
| 64
| 51.68
| 702,965
| 26
|- style="text-align:right;"
|bgcolor="" width=1|
| style="text-align:left;"| Al-Nour Party
|align="left" | Salafi Islamist
| 91
| 23
| 25.27
| 494,042
| 8
|- style="text-align:right;"
|  style="background:; width:1px;"|
| style="text-align:left;"| New Wafd Party
|align="left" | National liberalism
| 77
| 21
| 27.27
| 392,138
| 16
|- style="text-align:right;"
|bgcolor="#0080FF" width=1|
| style="text-align:left;"| Republican People's Party
|align="left" |Populism
| 42
| 14
| 33.33
| 198,822
| 11
|- style="text-align:right;"
|bgcolor="#8DB7E9" width=1|
| style="text-align:left;"| Democratic Peace Party
|align="left" | Nationalism
| 57
| 8
| 14.03
| 155,847
| 1
|- style="text-align:right;"
|  style="background:; width:1px;"|
| style="text-align:left;"| Conference Party
|align="left" | National liberalism
| 53
| 7
| 13.20
| 105,975
| 5
|- style="text-align:right;"
| bgcolor="blue" style="width:1|
| style="text-align:left;"| Homeland Defenders Party
|align="left" | Populism
| 51
| 5
| 9.80
| 89,875
| 7
|- style="text-align:right;"
|  style="background:#1935D0; width:1px;"|
| style="text-align:left;"| Freedom Party
|align="left" | Liberalism
| 6
| 3
| 50.00
| 68,926
| 1
|- style="text-align:right;"
|  style="background:Orange; width:1px;"|
| style="text-align:left;"| Egyptian Social Democratic Party
|align="left" | Social liberalism
| 41
| 5
| 12.19
| 56,922
| 3
|- style="text-align:right;"
|  style="background:; width:1px;"|
| style="text-align:left;"| Egyptian Patriotic Movement
|align="left" | Secularism
| 60
| 4
| 6.66
| 45,014
| 1
|- style="text-align:right;"
| style="background:#D8F691;width:1px;"|
| style="text-align:left;"| My Homeland Egypt Party
|align="left" | Populism
| 20
| 3
| 15.00
| 29,971
| 1
|- style="text-align:right;"
| style="background:#8B0000;width:1px;"|
| style="text-align:left;"| Modern Egypt Party
|align="left" | Liberalism
| 25
| 2
| 8.00
| 25,993
| 2
|- style="text-align:right;"
| bgcolor="" style="width:1px;"|
| style="text-align:left;"| Conservative
|align="left" | Conservatism
| 14
| 1
| 4.28
| 23,042
| 1
|- style="text-align:right;"
| style="background:#6D74C4;width:1px;"|
| style="text-align:left;"| Free Egyptian Building Party
|align="left" |
| 11
| 1
| 9.09
| 
| 1
|- style="text-align:right;"
| bgcolor="" style="width:1px;"|
| style="text-align:left;"| Leader Party
|align="left" |
| 9
| 1
| 11.11
| 
| 0
|- style="text-align:right;"
|  style="background:gray; width:1px;"|
| style="text-align:left;"| Other/Independents
| style="text-align:left;"| ----
| 
| 
| 
| 
| 
|- class="sortbottom" | style="background-color:#E9E9E9" | align="right"
|
|align="left"|Total
| style="text-align:left;"| 
|
|
|
|
|
|
|}

Expatriates
The results for expatriate voting during the first phase were announced on 20 October 2015.

Boycotts
A number of parties boycotted the election, claiming that the process was unfair. These included the following:
Bread and Freedom Party
Building and Development Party
Civil Democratic Current (withdrew from the election for lack of funds)
Freedom Egypt Party
Homeland Party
National Conciliation Party (withdrew from the election)
Reawakening of Egypt (will not participate in the election)
Revolutionary Socialists
Social Justice Coalition (chose not to participate in the election)
Strong Egypt Party
Al-Wasat Party

Rules for media coverage of elections by Supreme Electoral Commission
Maintain objectivity and refrain from inserting personal views in news
Deliver accurate information
Refrain from using misleading titles or pictures unrelated to content
Refrain from using vague designations
It is strictly forbidden to ask voters who they will vote for
It is forbidden to conduct polls and surveys in front of polling stations
It is forbidden to phrase questions in a way that encourages a particular response
Reporters must respect the right of reply

References

Egypt
Parliamentary election
Elections in Egypt
Parliamentary election
Parliamentary election
Election and referendum articles with incomplete results